Omavi Ammu Minder (born October 7, 1999), better known as Mavi (stylized in all caps), is an American rapper from Charlotte, North Carolina. Mavi emerged in 2014 as a member of North Carolina music collective KILLSWITCH, and later rose to prominence in 2019 with the release of his debut solo album Let the Sun Talk and his guest appearance on Earl Sweatshirt's EP Feet of Clay. His most recent album, Laughing so Hard, it Hurts, was released in 2022 and met with critical acclaim, including "Best New Music" from Pitchfork.

Discography

Studio albums
 Let the Sun Talk (2019)
 Laughing So Hard, it Hurts (2022)

Extended plays
 End of the Earth (2021)

Mixtapes
 Beacon (2016)
 No Roses (2017)

Collaborative albums
 Rosewood Records Presents: Killswitch 2017  (2017)
 Rosewood Records Presents: Killswitch Vol. 2 2019  (2021)

References 

1999 births
Living people
Rappers from North Carolina
Musicians from Charlotte, North Carolina
Alternative hip hop musicians